Mission Rock station is a light rail station on the Muni Metro T Third Street line, located in the median of Third Street at Mission Rock Street in the Mission Bay neighborhood of San Francisco, California. The station opened with the T Third Street line on January 13, 2007. It has two side platforms; the northbound platform is north of Mission Rock Street, and the southbound platform south of Mission Rock Street, which allows trains to pass through the intersection before stopping at the station.

References

External links 

SFMTA: Mission Rock northbound, southbound
SF Bay Transit (unofficial): Third Street & Mission Rock St

Muni Metro stations
Railway stations in the United States opened in 2007